Baffes is a surname. Notable people with the surname include:

Thomas Baffes (1923–1997), American surgeon and attorney
John Baffes